Howard Coffin may refer to:
 Howard A. Coffin (1877–1956), Michigan politician
 Howard E. Coffin (1873–1937), automobile and aircraft engineer and industrialist